Roscoe  is a village in Winnebago County, Illinois, along the Rock River. It is in a suburban area of the Rockford, Illinois Metropolitan Statistical Area. As of the 2010 census, the village population was 10,785, up from 6,244 at the 2000 census. The area has been undergoing a period of rapid growth. There have been numerous border disputes with its neighbor to the west, Rockton, Illinois, and development and annexations continue by both villages. Recent growth has included the Promontory Ridge and Hidden Creek custom home subdivisions east of the Illinois Tollway, I-39/I-90.

History
Though settled in the 1830s, Roscoe was incorporated as a village in 1965. The village was named after Roscoe Township.  Harlem-Roscoe Fire Department Station Three, located at 13974 Willowbrook Rd, was hit by an EF-1 tornado on May 22, 2011.  Path length was 1 mile long and 50 yards wide, no injuries were reported.

Geography 
According to the 2010 census, Roscoe is located at  (42.414841, -89.010470).

Demographics 

As of the census of 2000, there were 6,244 people including 2,211 households and 1,740 families residing in the village. The racial makeup of the village was 95.26% White, 1.91% African American, 0.22% Native American, 0.82% Asian, 0.02% Pacific Islander, 0.74% from other races, and 1.04% from two or more races. Hispanic or Latino of any race were 2.50% of the population.

Of the 2,211 households, 44.5% had children under the age of 18, 67.4% were married couples living together, 7.1% had a female householder with no husband present, and 21.3% were non-families. 16.5% of all households were made up of individuals, and 4.3% had someone living alone who was 65 years of age or older. The average household size was 2.82 members and the average family size was 3.19 members.

In the village, the population was spread out, with 31.7% under the age of 18, 6.5% from 18 to 24, 35.6% from 25 to 44, 19.6% from 45 to 64, and 6.7% who were 65 years of age or older. The median age was 33 years. For every 100 females, there were 99.1 males. For every 100 females age 18 and over, there were 99.3 males.

The median income for a household in the village was $59,267, and the median income for a family was $61,515. Males had a median income of $48,356 versus $30,060 for females. The per capita income for the village was $25,324. About 1.7% of families and 2.9% of the population were below the poverty line, including 2.1% of those under age 18 and none of those age 65 or over.

Government 
Mark Szula is the Village President since his election in April 2019 for a four-year term. He is a former trustee of the Village of Roscoe.

Schools 
The four public schools in Roscoe are part of the Kinnikinnick School District.  These are Ledgewood School (grades PreK-1), Stone Creek School (grades 2-3), Kinnikinnick School (grades 4-5), and Roscoe Middle School (grades 6-8).  There is no public high school in the village, so high school students attending a public school must attend Hononegah High School in neighboring Rockton, Illinois, or Harlem High School, in Machesney Park, IL.  The school district is involved in a court action to use eminent domain to acquire land in Roscoe for a high school. Roscoe Middle School is the largest feeder school for Hononegah High School.  The Prairie Hill Community Consolidated School District #133 also serves parts of Roscoe's northeast area. Parts of the southern areas are served by Harlem School District 122. Rockford School District 205 serves the SE section of the village.

Notable people

 John Q. Briggs, Minnesota state senator, was born in Roscoe.
 Nicole Manske, sports reporter and Miss Illinois Teen USA (1998), co-host of The Speed Report; native of Roscoe
 Danica Patrick, driver, only woman to win in the IndyCar Series and only woman to get a lead laps in both the Indianapolis 500 and Daytona 500 and get top tens in both; grew up in Roscoe.

References

External links 

 Midwest Government Info
 Village of Roscoe
 Roscoe News
 StatelineInfo.com - Roscoe Business & Government Listings

Villages in Winnebago County, Illinois
Villages in Illinois
Rockford metropolitan area, Illinois
Populated places established in 1965